The Macit Özcan Sports Complex is a multi-sport complex located at Yenişehir district in Mersin, Turkey. It is named after Macit Özcan, the mayor of Greater Mersin.

The complex is situated to the west of İsmet İnönü Boulevard. The Nevin Yanıt Athletics Complex is to the south of Macit Özcan Complex.

There is also an aerobic center and a gymnasium for the visitors in addition to a hotel, a restaurant and a conference hall at the site.

During the 2013 Mediterranean Games, the complex hosted the water polo events on 19–26 June.

References

External links
Images of the complex

Sports venues in Mersin
Sports venues completed in 2008
Swimming venues in Turkey
2013 Mediterranean Games venues
Yenişehir, Mersin